Cruciger is a surname. Notable people with the surname include:
Elisabeth Cruciger (–1535), author of the early Protestant hymn "Herr Christ, der einig Gotts Sohn"
Caspar Cruciger the Elder (1504–1548), German humanist
Caspar Cruciger the Younger (1525–1597), German theologian

See also
Cruciger, a fungal genus
Globus cruciger, an orb topped with a cross
Polypedates cruciger, a species of frog